Streptomyces pseudovenezuelae is a bacterium species from the genus of Streptomyces which has been isolated from lead polluted soil in China. Streptomyces pseudovenezuelae produces chloramphenicol and setomimycin.

See also 
 List of Streptomyces species

References

Further reading

External links
Type strain of Streptomyces pseudovenezuelae at BacDive -  the Bacterial Diversity Metadatabase

pseudovenezuelae
Bacteria described in 1970